Jose Rolando Olvera Jr. (born 1963) is  a United States district judge of the United States District Court for the Southern District of Texas.

Biography

Olvera received a Bachelor of Arts degree in 1985 from Harvard University. He received a Juris Doctor in 1989 from the University of Texas School of Law. He worked at the law firm of Atlas & Hall LLP, from 1990 to 1993, and at the law firm of Fleming & Olvera, PC and its predecessor firms, from 1994 to 2000. From 2001 to 2002, he served as a District Judge for the 357th District Court of Texas. From 2003 to 2004, he worked as a solo practitioner and at the law firm of Spain & Olvera. From 2005 to 2006, he served as a District Judge for the 138th District Court of Texas. From 2007 to 2008, he worked as a solo practitioner and part-time as a Brownsville Municipal Court Judge. From 2009 to 2015, he served as a District Judge for the 445th District Court of Texas. From 2011 to 2015, he served as the Presiding Judge of the Fifth Administrative Judicial Region of Texas.

Federal judicial service

On September 18, 2014, President Barack Obama nominated Olvera to serve as a United States District Judge of the United States District Court for the Southern District of Texas, to the seat vacated by Judge Hilda G. Tagle, who assumed senior status on December 31, 2012. On December 16, 2014, his nomination was returned to the President due to the sine die adjournment of the 113th Congress. On January 7, 2015, President Obama renominated him to the same position. He received a hearing before the Judiciary Committee on January 21, 2015. On February 26, 2015, his nomination was reported out of committee by a voice vote. On May 21, 2015, the U.S. Senate confirmed his nomination by a 100–0 vote. He received his judicial commission on August 4, 2015.

See also 
List of Hispanic/Latino American jurists

References

External links

1963 births
Living people
Harvard University alumni
Hispanic and Latino American judges
Judges of the United States District Court for the Southern District of Texas
People from Houston
Texas lawyers
Texas state court judges
United States district court judges appointed by Barack Obama
21st-century American judges
University of Texas School of Law alumni